Paralebeda is a genus of moths in the family Lasiocampidae. The genus was erected by Per Olof Christopher Aurivillius in 1894.

Species
Paralebeda achillesi Zolotuhin, Treadaway & Witt, 1998
Paralebeda achillesi mindoroensis Zolotuhin, Treadaway & Witt, 1998
Paralebeda crinodes (Felder, 1868)
Paralebeda crinodes paos Zolotuhin, 1996
Paralebeda crinodes uniformis Holloway, 1976
Paralebeda dimorpha  Zolotuhin & Witt, 2005
Paralebeda eggerti  Zolotuhin & Witt, 2005
Paralebeda femorata  (Ménétriés, 1858)
Paralebeda flores  Zolotuhin & Witt, 2005
Paralebeda lagua  Zolotuhin, Treadaway & Witt, 1998
Paralebeda lucifuga (Swinhoe, 1892)
Paralebeda plagifera  (Walker, 1855)
Paralebeda pluto  Zolotuhin, Treadaway & Witt, 1998
Paralebeda sericeofasciata  (Aurivillius, 1921)
Paralebeda vritra  Zolotuhin & J.D. Holloway, 2006

References 
, 1980, Le genre Paralebeda Aurivillius, 1894 25e contribution à l'étude des Lasiocampides, Zeitschrift der arbeitsgemeinschaft Österr. Entomologen 32 (1/2): 18–28. 
, 1996, To a study of Asiatic Lasiocampidae 3. Short taxonomic notes on Paralebeda Aurivillius, 1894 (Lepidoptera), Entomofauna 17 (13): 245–256.
, 1998: The Lasiocampidae (Lepidoptera) of the Philippines. Nachrichten des Entomologischen Vereins Apollo Supplement 17: 133–222.
, 2005, Contribution to the knowledge of Indonesian Lasiocampidae (Lepidoptera), Tinea 19 (1): 59–68.
, 2006, The Lasiocampidae of Sulawesi, Tinea 19 (3): 244-259

External links

Lasiocampidae